Procol Harum were an English progressive rock band from Southend-on-Sea. Formed in April 1967, the group originally consisted of vocalist and pianist Gary Brooker, guitarist Ray Royer, bassist David Knights, keyboardist Matthew Fisher, drummer Bobby Harrison and lyricist Keith Reid. The band went through a number of lineup changes over the next ten years, before disbanding in 1977. They reformed in 1991 and remained active until Brooker’s death in early 2022. The final lineup of Procol Harum consisted of Brooker, guitarist Geoff Whitehorn (from 1991), bassist Matt Pegg (from 1993), keyboardist Josh Phillips (in 1993, and from 2004) and drummer Geoff Dunn (from 2006).

History

1967–1977
Procol Harum were formed in April 1967 by former Paramounts pianist and vocalist Gary Brooker and his songwriting partner Keith Reid, who enlisted Ray Royer, David Knights, Matthew Fisher and Bobby Harrison for the group's initial incarnation. For the recording of the band's debut single "A Whiter Shade of Pale", producer Denny Cordell brought in session drummer Bill Eyden in place of Harrison. Shortly after the single was released, Royer and Harrison left Procol Harum to form Freedom, with Brooker's former Paramounts bandmates Robin Trower and Barrie "B. J." Wilson taking their respective positions. The new lineup released Procol Harum, Shine On Brightly and A Salty Dog, before Fisher and Knights left in late 1969. They were replaced by another former Paramounts member, Chris Copping.

As a four-piece, Procol Harum released Home and Broken Barricades, before Trower left in July 1971 to pursue a solo career. He was replaced by Dave Ball, while Alan Cartwright (a former bandmate of Wilson's in Freddie Mack's band) took over bass from Copping, who remained on organ. This lineup's only release was Live: In Concert with the Edmonton Symphony Orchestra, as Ball left in September 1972 during sessions for their next studio album and was replaced by Mick Grabham. Grand Hotel, Exotic Birds and Fruit and Procol's Ninth followed over the next three years, before Cartwright left in June 1976; Copping subsequently reverted to bass, as Peter Solley joined as the band's new organ player. The new lineup debuted on Something Magic, the band's last studio album for 14 years.

In April 1977, during the promotional tour for Something Magic, Copping joined Frankie Miller's band and was replaced in Procol Harum by Elton John's former bassist Dee Murray. The tour ended in May, and the following month Grabham announced that he had left the band, claiming that he had been "generally dissatisfied with my role ... for some months". The band played one final show in October when "A Whiter Shade of Pale" co-won the Single of the Year award at the 1977 Brit Awards, with Brooker, Wilson and returning members Cartwright and Copping joined by guitarist Tim Renwick.

1991–2006

In 1991, Brooker reformed Procol Harum with guitarist Robin Trower and organist Matthew Fisher, plus new members Dave Bronze on bass and Mark Brzezicki on drums. It was originally planned that B. J. Wilson would return on drums, however he died in 1990 after three years in a persistent vegetative state following a drug overdose. Trower left again after recording The Prodigal Stranger, with Tim Renwick returning for the subsequent tour. Renwick was replaced later in the year by Geoff Whitehorn. After a tour which spawned One More Time: Live in Utrecht 1992, Fisher briefly stepped away from the band to focus on studying for a degree, with Don Snow temporarily taking over for a summer tour. Laurence Cottle substituted for Bronze, who was performing with the Hamsters, at a show in August.

After nearly a year of inactivity, Procol Harum performed a handful of shows in May and June 1993, with former Diamond Head keyboardist Josh Phillips filling in for Fisher and former King Crimson drummer Ian Wallace in place of Brzezicki, who had rejoined Big Country. Fisher returned for shows starting in July, and Matt Pegg replaced Bronze the following month. Touring continued sporadically throughout the rest of the decade – Graham Broad performed drums for a run of shows in July and August 1995, and Henry Spinetti took over for shows in 1996. In 1997, the band played a one-off show in celebration of the 30th anniversary of "A Whiter Shade of Pale", with the regular lineup joined on several songs by former members Mick Grabham, Peter Solley, Alan Cartwright, Dave Bronze and Chris Copping.

Three years passed before Procol Harum performed again, in September 2000 with returning drummer Mark Brzezicki. They returned on a full-time basis the following year, touring regularly and releasing their first studio album in more than ten years, The Well's on Fire, in 2003. Long-time organist Matthew Fisher left the band in June 2004 due to "unresolved matters", with former stand-in Josh Phillips taking his place again. These matters were later revealed to have been a lawsuit filed by Fisher against Brooker and the band for songwriting credits and a share of royalties on "A Whiter Shade of Pale", which he won in December 2006.

2006–2022
In the autumn of 2006, Geoff Dunn replaced Mark Brzezicki on drums. The band's lineup has since remained constant since Dunn's arrival. However, the group's 2017 studio album Novum was their first not to feature lyrics by Keith Reid (most were written by Pete Brown). 

Brooker died on 19 February 2022 with all following concerts being cancelled before and after his death, suggesting the band have disbanded.

Members

Final line-up

Former members

Additional musicians

Timeline

Lineups

Bibliography

References

Procol Harum